In Greek mythology, Chrysippus (/kraɪˈsɪpəs, krɪ-/; Ancient Greek: Χρύσιππος) may refer to the following individuals:

 Chrysippus, illegitimate son of Pelops abducted by Laius.
 Chrysippus, an Egyptian prince as one of the 50 sons of King Aegyptus. His mother was a Tyria and thus full brother of Clitus and Sthenelus. In some accounts, he could be a son of Aegyptus either by Eurryroe, daughter of the river-god Nilus, or Isaie, daughter of King Agenor of Tyre. Clitus suffered the same fate as his other brothers, save Lynceus, when they were slain on their wedding night by their wives who obeyed the command of their father King Danaus of Libya. He married the Danaid Chrysippe, daughter of Danaus and Memphis.
Chrysippus, son of Aeolus.
 Chrysippus, eponymous founder of Chrysippa in Cilicia.

Notes

References 

 Gaius Julius Hyginus, Fabulae from The Myths of Hyginus translated and edited by Mary Grant. University of Kansas Publications in Humanistic Studies. Online version at the Topos Text Project.
 Pseudo-Apollodorus, The Library with an English Translation by Sir James George Frazer, F.B.A., F.R.S. in 2 Volumes, Cambridge, MA, Harvard University Press; London, William Heinemann Ltd. 1921. Online version at the Perseus Digital Library. Greek text available from the same website.
 Stephanus of Byzantium, Stephani Byzantii Ethnicorum quae supersunt, edited by August Meineike (1790-1870), published 1849. A few entries from this important ancient handbook of place names have been translated by Brady Kiesling. Online version at the Topos Text Project.
Tzetzes, John, Book of Histories, Book VII-VIII translated by Vasiliki Dogani from the original Greek of T. Kiessling's edition of 1826. Online version at theio.com

Princes in Greek mythology